Mannix is an American detective television series that ran from 1967 to 1975 on CBS. It was created by Richard Levinson and William Link, and developed by executive producer Bruce Geller. The title character, Joe Mannix, is a private investigator played by actor Mike Connors.

Premise
During the first season of the series, Joe Mannix works for a large Los Angeles detective agency called Intertect, which was the planned original title of the show. His superior is Lew Wickersham, played by Joseph Campanella. Intertect uses computers to help solve crimes.

As opposed to the other employees, Mannix belonged to the classic American detective archetype, thus he usually ignores the computers' solutions, disobeys his boss's orders, and sets out to do things his own way. He wears plaid sport coats and has his own office that he keeps sloppy between his assignments. Lew has cameras in all the rooms of the Intertect offices monitoring the performance of his employees and providing instant feedback through intercoms in the room. Unlike the other Intertect operatives, Mannix attempts to block the camera with a coat rack and questions Lew, comparing him to Big Brother.

To improve the ratings of the show, Desilu head Lucille Ball and producer Bruce Geller made some changes, making the show similar to other private-eye shows. Ball thought the computers were too high-tech and beyond the comprehension of the average viewer of the time, and had them removed. In the first episode of season two, Mannix explains that he had quit Intertect.

From the second season on, Mannix works on his own with the assistance of his loyal secretary Peggy Fair, a police officer's widow played by Gail Fisher – one of the first black actresses to have a regular series role. He also has a working relationship with the Los Angeles Police Department, as he often exchanges information with his contacts. The first of these to have a featured role was Lieutenant George Kramer, portrayed by Larry Linville, who had been partnered with Peggy's late husband. Over the course of the series, Mannix's most frequently used contact is Lieutenant Art Malcolm, played by Ward Wood. Another semiregular guest, although not as frequent, was Robert Reed, whose appearances as Lieutenant Adam Tobias coincided with his tenure on The Brady Bunch, which also was produced by Paramount Television. Jack Ging played another Mannix contact, Lieutenant Dan Ives, who made several appearances later in the series.
Yet another LAPD contact was Lieutenant Dave Angstrom, played by Frank Campanella (real-life brother of Joseph Campanella).
In the 1969 season, he also employs the services of a competitive private investigator, Albie Loos (performed by Joe Mantell), as a sort of investigative gofer. In the 1972 season, Albie returns, played by a different actor (Milton Selzer).

While Mannix was not generally known as a show that explored socially relevant topics, several episodes had topical themes. Season two had episodes featuring compulsive gambling, deaf and blind characters who were instrumental in solving cases in spite of their physical limitations, and episodes that focused on racism against Blacks and Hispanics. Season six had an episode focusing on the effects that the Vietnam War had on returning veterans, including the effects of PTSD.

Character
Joseph R. "Joe" Mannix is a regular guy, without pretense, who has a store of proverbs on which to rely in conversation. What demons he has mostly come from having fought in the U.S. Army during the Korean War, where as an Airborne Ranger Lieutenant he led a twelve-man team operating behind enemy lines for three months before being captured by the Chinese Communists,  he was initially listed as MIA while he was a prisoner of war in a brutal POW camp until he escaped. Over the length of the series, a sizable percentage of his old Army comrades turn out to have homicidal impulses against him, as does his fellow running back from his college football days. (The episode that introduced police Lieutenant Art Malcolm portrayed him as a Korean War buddy of Mannix's, but that connection was generally ignored thereafter.)

During the series, Mannix is also revealed to have worked as a mercenary in Latin America. Like the actor Mike Connors who played the title role, Mannix is of Armenian descent, and speaks fluent Armenian from time to time during the series, as well as conversational Spanish.

Mannix is notable for the high level of physical punishment he withstands. During the course of the series, he is shot and wounded over a dozen separate times, and knocked unconscious around 55 times. He frequently takes brutal beatings to the abdomen; some of these went on quite a long time, particularly by the television standards of the era. Whenever he gets into one of his convertibles (in season one, Mannix drove a customized Oldsmobile Toronado, replete with a panoramic rear-view mirror; in seasons 2–6, he drove a Dodge Challenger or Plymouth Barracuda; in the final season. he drove a Chevrolet Camaro), he can expect to be shot at or run off the road by another car or find his vehicle sabotaged. Nevertheless, he keeps his cool and perseveres until his antagonists are brought down.

While making the television pilot "The Name Is Mannix", Connors dislocated his shoulder running away during a From Russia with Love–type helicopter pursuit, and broke his left wrist punching a stuntman who happened to be wearing a steel plate on his back. This character aspect was lampooned multiple times by radio comedians Bob and Ray, with "Blimmix" beginning as being portrayed as dim-witted, and ending with Blimmix being soundly beaten by his adversary. These parodies retained the theme song composed by Lalo Schifrin at the beginning and conclusion.

Starting in season two, Mannix lives and works in West Los Angeles in a mixed-use development called Paseo Verde; his home at 17 Paseo Verde has an attached office from which he runs his agency. The design for the 17 Paseo Verde set is based on a Santa Barbara, California, building that still exists.

Mannix grew up in a town called Summer Grove, where he was a star football and basketball player. Summer Grove had a thriving Armenian immigrant community. As of 1969, Mannix's mother had died 10 years earlier, and Mannix had not been back to the town since the funeral. Mannix's estranged father, Stefan (played by Victor Jory), was still living in Summer Grove, and Mannix and his father started a reconciliation. When Mannix returns to Summer Grove for a case three years later, he and his father are on good terms.

Following military service in the Korean War, Mannix attended Western Pacific University on the GI Bill, graduated in 1955, and obtained his private investigator's license in 1956. He has a black belt in karate. Throughout the series, he appears proficient in a variety of athletic pursuits, including sailing, horseback riding, and skiing. He is an accomplished pool player and golfs regularly, and is also a skilled airplane pilot. In the first season, he carries a Walther PP semiautomatic pistol. From the second season on, Mannix carries a Colt Detective Special snubnosed revolver in .38 Special caliber.

Appearances on other shows
In 1971, Connors guest-starred on an episode of Here's Lucy entitled "Lucy and Mannix Are Held Hostage".

In 1997, Connors reprised the role of Mannix in an episode of Diagnosis: Murder titled "Hard-Boiled Murder", which served as a sequel to the 1973 Mannix episode "Little Girl Lost". Several other actors from the old Mannix episode also reprised their roles. In a comic reference to Mannix's famous history of serious injuries, the show portrayed the main character of Diagnosis: Murder, Dr. Mark Sloan (Dick van Dyke), as Mannix's longtime physician.

Mannix was referred to several times in Mystery Science Theater 3000 episodes when a foot chase or a fight occurred.

Production
Gary Morton, Lucille Ball's second husband and head of Desilu Studios, noticed a 1937 Bentley convertible being driven by Mike Connors. A car enthusiast, Morton began talking about cars to Connors, when he remembered a Desilu detective show coming up in which he thought Connors would do well.

Mannix was initially a production of Desilu Productions, which had been purchased by Gulf + Western earlier in 1967. During the first season, Gulf + Western integrated Desilu's operations into its Paramount Pictures subsidiary, and the company became Paramount Television. The series featured a dynamic split-screen opening credits sequence set to theme music from noted composer Lalo Schifrin. Unusual for a private detective series, the Mannix theme is in triple time, the same signature used for waltzes.

The show's title card, opening credits, and closing credits roll are set in variations of the City typeface, a squared-off, split-serif face that was long used by IBM Corporation as part of their corporate design and still appears in their logo. This refers to the computers used by Intertect in the first season. The dot over the "i" in Mannix had the appearance of a computer tape reel. This was removed after the first season.

Over the life of the series, several famous entertainers were featured in one-time roles, including Neil Diamond and Buffalo Springfield as themselves and Lou Rawls as a club singer, Rich Little as an impressionist, and Milton Berle as a stand-up comedian. Essay humorist Art Buchwald also had a cameo role unrelated to journalism, and in another episode, Rona Barrett played herself.

Cancellation
Mannix finished its eighth season in the top 20 in the Nielsen ratings and plans were made for a ninth season. Mike Connors said that he had been told at a CBS network party the week before the network was to release its 1975 fall schedule that the show was a certain pickup. However, something out of Connors' control left him without a job shortly thereafter.

The incident did not involve primetime programming at CBS, but instead involved the late-night network offerings of the other two major networks at the time. The Tonight Show Starring Johnny Carson was the overwhelming ratings leader in the period for NBC. ABC had been a distant third in the battle during the 1970s after replacing The Dick Cavett Show with a wheel series referred to as Wide World of Entertainment. Looking to improve its ratings against Carson and The CBS Late Movie, which CBS was airing at the time, ABC began contacting production companies in an attempt to purchase rebroadcast rights for various series.

At the time, ABC and Paramount had a fairly successful relationship that was starting to build. ABC took advantage of that and approached Paramount with an offer to purchase the rights to rebroadcast older episodes of Mannix as part of their late-night lineup, which they agreed to do.

CBS was unhappy with the move, as Paramount had not informed them of what they were planning to do. The idea of having one of their series airing on a competing network, even if it was only in reruns, turned the tide of opinion against Mannix, as CBS felt viewers would stay away from the newer episodes airing on their network since they could watch the series on a competitor. Thus, when CBS released its schedule a few days later, Mannix was not a part of it. Connors found out about the cancellation through a phone call, with a reporter contacting him asking for comment. Connors said in a later interview, "I felt so lost when it was over."

Mannix's automobiles
The automobile was a focus of Mannix's professional life, and he had several of them as his personal vehicle in the eight-year run of the series. Those were:
 Season one – 1966 Mercury Comet Caliente convertible (pilot episode: "The Name Is Mannix"), 1967 Mercury Comet Cyclone convertible (one episode only: "Skid Marks on a Dry Run"), 1967 Ford Galaxie 500 four-door hardtop, then a 1967 Ford Fairlane 500 four-door sedan after the Galaxie got shot up – both were Intertect company cars (one episode only: "The Cost of a Vacation"). In all other season-one episodes, Mannix drove a 1967 Oldsmobile Toronado customized into a roadster by George Barris, builder of TV's Batmobile from the 1960s Batman ABC series, since the producers wanted a convertible and Oldsmobile never produced an open-topped Toronado. Due to a change in episode run order ("The Cost of a Vacation" was the second episode of Mannix shot after the pilot, although it was the sixth episode CBS broadcast), the one-shot appearances of the Galaxie and Fairlane were after the Toronado had been established as Mannix's car.
 Season two – 1968 Dodge Dart GTS 340 convertible "kustomized" by George Barris with functional hood scoops, Lucas Flamethrower driving lights, blacked-out grille, racing-style gas filler cap, molded-in rear spoiler, blacked out tail light panel, and custom tail light lenses. The car was originally red, but Executive Producer Bruce Geller wanted it changed to a British Racing Green, which Barris did. (This car still retains its original red paint under the carpet.) A Motorola car-phone (a remarkably expensive and rare item in 1968) was installed. Rader mag wheels like those on the Batmobile were originally installed by Barris, but changed later in the 1968 season to Cragar S/S chrome wheels.  Barris also installed his own "Barris Kustoms" emblem on the lower part of each front fender. No duplicate 1968 Mannix Darts were built; it is a "one of one" car. This car was used in both the 1968 and 1969 seasons.

Though a 1969 Dart was built by Barris to replicate this car in the show's 1969 season, the 1968 Dart was regularly seen during the 1969 season. (In the 1969 episode "A Penny for the Peep Show", both the 1968 and 1969 Darts are used in the same shot, to elude a police tail on Mannix, but no explanation in the episode was given for why or how two identically customized green Dart convertibles show up together.)

In further tracing the car's history, the 1968 Dart was reportedly sold to a secretary at Paramount Studios and then was lost for decades until being discovered near a ranger station in the Southern California mountains. It has since been restored to its original Mannix/Barris condition and was featured in Hemmings Muscle Machines, December 2009 issue.

The 1968 Mannix Dart and its intriguing history were also featured on the TV show Drive on Discovery HD Theater in 2010. The TV show reunited the car with Mike Connors for the first time in over 40 years. 

The car is currently owned by C. Van Tune, former editor-in-chief of Motor Trend magazine, who conducted the TV interview with Mike Connors and who also wrote an article on the Mannix Dart for the summer 2011 issue of Motor Trend Classic magazine. In that article, the Dart is reunited with Mike Connors, George Barris, and Mannix stuntman Dick Ziker.

Another article on the famous Dart was published in the October 2011 issue of Mopar Action magazine. An article in the New York Times (July 22, 2012) included information on the 1968 Mannix Dart and a recent photo of Mike Connors with the car. The Mannix Dart was also mentioned on Sirius/XM Radio's "60s on 6" channel by disc jockey Mike Kelly.

In October 2016, the car magazine Power & Performance News  published an article on the 1968 "Mannix" Dart, written by C. Van Tune.

 Season three – A 1969 Dodge Dart GTS 340 convertible was "kustomized" by George Barris to replicate the 1968 Dart; this car was totalled in a wreck soon after being sold, following its use on the series.
 Season four – 1970 Plymouth Barracuda 340 dark green convertible
 Season five – Three 1971 Plymouth Barracuda convertibles (all dark green with green interiors and black soft tops) were supplied by Chrysler Corporation, and all had differently sized (318, 340, 383) engines. One was wrecked, but later repaired. In one episode, the hood is raised, dynamite is discovered, and the air cleaner reads 383.
 Season six – 1973 Plymouth Barracuda convertible (actually two of the 1971 cars updated with 1973 grilles, headlamps, front fenders, front/rear bumpers, and tail lights)
 Season seven – 1974 Dodge Challenger 360 Coupe: Two were built especially for the show, and had every available option installed, including the rare factory sunroof. Mild Barris customizing included Cragar S/S 15-inch chrome wheels, G60x15 Goodyear radial tires, and an upper body pinstripe.
 Season eight – A Chevrolet Camaro LT, and a red 1975 Chevrolet Impala two-door with a white convertible roof were used.

Peggy Fair's cars were less prominent, but in seasons two through eight, they included a Simca 1000, Simca 1204 hatchback, Dodge Colt hardtop, and finally a Chevrolet Vega hatchback.

Episodes

Guest stars
Mannix featured hundreds of guest stars:

Julie Adams
Charles Aidman
Claude Akins
Lew Alcindor
Anne Archer
Barry Atwater
Val Avery
Richard Bakalyan
Hugh Beaumont
Vincent Beck
Henry Beckman
Ed Begley Jr.
Pamela Bellwood
Lee Bergere
Oscar Beregi Jr
Milton Berle
Whit Bissell
Bill Bixby
Lloyd Bochner
Frank Bonner
Antoinette Bower
Eric Braeden
Geraldine Brooks
Kathie Browne
Richard Bull
Brooke Bundy
Victor Buono
Frank Campanella
Joseph Campanella
Anthony Caruso
Ted Cassidy
Robert Colbert
John Colicos
Robert Conrad
Yvonne Craig
John Dehner
Neil Diamond
John Doucette
Don Dubbins
Howard Duff
Anthony Eisley
Dana Elcar
Robert Ellenstein
Roy Engel
Erik Estrada
Linda Evans
Shelley Fabares
Norman Fell
Pamelyn Ferdin
Gail Fisher
Paul Fix
Victor French
Beverly Garland
Don Gordon
Harold Gould
Gloria Grahame
Kevin Hagen 
Sid Haig
Mariette Hartley
Katherine Helmond
Douglas Henderson
Howard Hesseman
John Hillerman
Kim Hunter
Diana Hyland
Jill Ireland
Robert Ito 
Mako Iwamatsu
Russell Johnson
Victor Jory
Gordon Jump
Katherine Justice
Diane Keaton
Sally Kellerman
Sandy Kenyon
Christopher Knight
Walter Koenig
Nancy Kovack
Frank Langella
Marta Kristen
Cloris Leachman
Robert Loggia
Ronald Long
Perry Lopez
Barbara Luna
Dawn Lyn
Ken Lynch
Carol Lynley
Larry Manetti
Paul Mantee
Scott Marlowe
John Marley
Arlene Martel
Marianne McAndrew
Darren McGavin
Katherine MacGregor
Gerald McRaney
Burgess Meredith
Judi Meredith
Lee Meriwether
Vera Miles
Del Monroe
Priscilla Morrill
Diana Muldaur
Richard Mulligan
Lloyd Nolan
Sheree North
Audree Norton
Mel Novak
Gerald S. O'Loughlin
David Opatoshu
Alan Oppenheimer
Julie Parrish
Leslie Parrish
Michael Pataki
Felton Perry
Nehemiah Persoff
Joanna Pettet
Barney Phillips
Paul Picerni
Slim Pickens
Phillip Pine 
Eve Plumb
Ann Prentiss
Ford Rainey
Logan Ramsey 
John Randolph 
Lou Rawls
Stafford Repp
Barbara Rhoades
John Ritter
Pernell Roberts
Percy Rodriguez
Marion Ross
Barbara Rush
Alfred Ryder
George Savalas
Tom Selleck
William Shatner
Martin Sheen
Tom Skerritt
Warren Stevens
Dean Stockwell
Jacqueline Susann
Loretta Swit
Nita Talbot
Vic Tayback
Berlinda Tolbert
Malachi Throne
Harry Townes
Joyce Van Patten
Elena Verdugo 
John Vernon
Garry Walberg
Jessica Walter
David Wayne
Fritz Weaver
Adam West
William Windom 
Paul Winfield
H. M. Wynant
Anthony Zerbe

Awards and honors
For his work on Mannix, Mike Connors was nominated for six Golden Globe Awards, winning once, and for four Emmy Awards. Gail Fisher was nominated for four Emmy Awards, winning once, and for three Golden Globe Awards, winning twice.

The series was twice nominated for the Emmy Award for Best Dramatic Series, and four times for the Golden Globe Award, winning once. In 1972, writer Mann Rubin won an Edgar Award from the Mystery Writers of America for the episode "A Step in Time".

Music
Lalo Schifrin composed the music for the series. The theme "Mannix", with the B-side "End Game", was released as a single in 1969.

Royalties lawsuit
In May 2011, Connors filed suit in Los Angeles Superior Court against Paramount and CBS Television Studios, claiming that he was never paid royalties from the Mannix series. With the release of the series on DVD, the case was later settled out of court in November of that year.

Home media
CBS Home Entertainment (distributed by Paramount) has released all eight seasons of Mannix on DVD in Region 1.

On May 9, 2017, CBS DVD released Mannix- The Complete Series on DVD in Region 1.

In Region 4, Shock has released the first three seasons on DVD in Australia.

Syndication
CBS Television Distribution holds the distribution rights for Mannix, but only distributes a package of 130 episodes to local stations. The first and eighth seasons are not part of the package, nor are several episodes from season seven.

The program currently airs on MeTV as part of its late-night lineup and has also aired on its sister network H&I; all 194 episodes of Mannix have aired on both networks.

It is currently being broadcast on FETV and on the British Network Forces TV.

Notes

References

External links

 
 Mannix official site at Nick at Nite
 DVD review of series and production history

1967 American television series debuts
1960s American crime television series
1975 American television series endings
1970s American crime drama television series
1970s American mystery television series
Best Drama Series Golden Globe winners
American detective television series
CBS original programming
Edgar Award-winning works
English-language television shows
Mannix, Joe
Television series by CBS Studios
Television shows set in Los Angeles
Television series by Desilu Productions
Films scored by Laurence Rosenthal
Television series created by Richard Levinson
Television series created by William Link